Overlook Park is an urban park in Oviedo, Florida, US. It is home to Clifton Springs, a mineral spring that flows from a pond into a canal and on to Lake Jesup.

Amenities
The park has access for picnicking, BBQ, boating, and fishing. There is also a boardwalk and a pavilion.

Location

Address
1988 Spring Ave, Oviedo, FL 32765

References

Parks in Florida
Parks in Seminole County, Florida